Beta Sigma Omega Phi (stylized βΣΩΦ, and also known as Betans 1968) is a service fraternity and sorority founded at University of Bohol on October 10, 1968. This was organized by Frank Paz Jr., Frederick Loor, and Remy Galbizo. Their aims are to foster lifetime brotherhood and sisterhood and to build noble leaders and better citizens. It also encourages the members to promote the welfare of students and to work for better and greater involvement in the affairs of the school as well as in the community. The organization is observed through different community civics and services like tree planting, feeding program, bloodletting, operation tuli, and lately the Brigada Eskwela. Betans 1968 had reached 72 collegiate chapters throughout Philippines and most of the chapters are in the island of Mindanao.

History 

On October 10, 1968, three students from the University of Bohol namely: Frank Paz Jr., Frederick Loor, and Remy Galbizo organized the Beta Sigma Omega Phi, service fraternity and sorority.
Before organizing this fraternity and sorority decided to first walk 42 kilometers barefooted and a two-day fasting. They only drank water on their two-day fasting. After these sacrifices, the founders held their first initiation with 12 neophytes. Sad to note that after 4 years of growing, the organization was in vain because President Ferdinand Marcos declared Martial Law in the Philippines. During this time no fraternities and sororities were allowed to render initiation or to form organization and assemble in the public even if it is not contrary to law. However, few years after the remaining members of the Betans decided to pursue the fraternity and sorority. By September 23, 1978 they held another initiation which served as an opportunity to those who wanted to join the organization.
For almost two decades the organization penetrated only in Tagbilaran City, Bohol schools and universities particularly the founding school University of Bohol (UB) as Alpha chapter, Philippine Maritime Institute as Beta chapter and some members are coming from Holy Name University formerly known as Divine Word College.

1980s 

Some of the members of the schools are coming from the cities and provinces of Mindanao that gradually moved the organization to Mindanao. In the early 80s, there were members in UB who were apparently residing in Kibawe, Bukidnon where they conducted initiation in the area wherein the pledges were studying in University of Visayas, in Cebu City, Southwestern University, in Cebu City, and some schools in CDO and Maramag, Bukidnon but under the supervision of the alumni members in Kibawe. Also of the same era, there were members in Butuan City and established chapter in SJIT. In 1987, headed by Brod Boyet Abay of Holy Name University, brod Dennis Larrobis of University of Bohol and others are residing in Lupon, Davao Oriental held the first initiation of the pledges coming from MATS College of Technology, Davao City and marked as the fourth collegiate chapter and named it as Delta Chapter. Of the same year, another initiation with the pledges from University of Southeastern Philippines (USEP), Davao City that marked as the fifth collegiate chapter and later established another eight collegiate chapters in Davao City.

1990s 

In 1991, headed by Brod Roy Dano, Brod Gabo Santiago of MATS went to Tacurong and recruited college students from Sultan Kudarat Educational Institute, Notredame Of Tacurong College, and Sultan Kudarat Polytechnic State College (Tacurong City Campus) known today as Sultan Kudarat State University. Later these three schools established a chapter. The 1990s symbolizes of the golden era of the organization particularly in Mindanao Island with tremendous growth in terms of membership. From Tacurong, the organization moved to almost all universities/colleges of Isulan, Gen. Santos City, Koronadal City, M’lang, Midsayap, Matalam, Kidapawan City, Kabacan, and Cotabato City. In 1993, Central Mindanao University (CMU) in Musuan, Maramag Bukidnon created a chapter headed by Brod Jesser Pairat and of the same year in Cagayan de Oro College headed by Brod Noel Mundo

2000 - Present 

The continuous growth was still observed in the year 2000, some of the alumni members of University of Bohol survived 1990's went home to their hometown and created collegiate chapters particularly in Sacred Heart College in Calamba, Misamis Occidental, re-established some of the collegiate chapters in Cagayan de Oro like Cagayan de Oro College and also colleges/universities the town of Balingasag and Jasaan, Misamis Oriental. Of the same year, two collegiate chapters in Mati City, Davao Oriental were created and also in the province of COMVAL, Bansalan, Dvo. del Sur and Bislig City. In 2014, the membership of the organization had also reached in Paniqui, Tarlac and Cabanatuan, Nueva Ecija.  The organization has a total of 72 collegiate chapters.

National Convention 

On October 9–10, 2011, the first National Convention was held in Davao City with the leadership of the interim National Council: president of the organization Brod Brian G. Caintic of Omega Chapter and Sai Che Gonzaga of Sigma Chapter. The event was successful because some of the queries as regards to the growth of the organization were answered even though only ten collegiate chapters were present.

Outreach program and community service 

The organization has a various community services like tree planting, operation tuli, coastal clean-up, feeding program, blood donation (blood letting), project tsinelas, and brigada eskwela.

Lists of Chapters 

 University of Bohol, Tagbilaran City - Alpha Chapter
 Philippine Marine Institute / Holy Name University, Tagbilaran City - Beta Chapter
 Saint Joseph Institute / Urios University, Butuan City - Gamma Chapter
 MATS College of Technology, Davao City - Delta Chapter
 University of Southeastern Philippines, Davao City - Epsilon Chapter
 Sultan Kudarat Educational Institute (SKEI), Tacurong City - Zeta Chapter
 Notre Dame of Tacurong College, Tacurong City - Eta Chapter
 Sultan Kudarat State University, Tacurong City - Theta Chapter
 Cagayan de Oro College/LICEO/Capitol University, CDO - Iota Chapter
 Central Mindanao University (CMU) / BNHSHI, Maramag, Bukidnon - Kappa Chapter
 Philippine Computer College, Maramag, Bukidnon - Lambda Chapter
 Kings College of Isulan - Mu Chapter
 Sultan Kudarat State University (Isulan Campus) - Nu Chapter
 Davao Merchant Marine Academy (DMMA) - Xi Chapter
 Mindanao Polytechnic College (MPC), Gen. San. - Omicron Chapter
 Mindanao State University (MSU), Gen San. - Pi chapter
 Notre Dame of Dadiangas University (NDDU), Gen. San. - Rho Chapter 
 University of Mindanao (UM), Davao City - Sigma Chapter
 AMA Computer College, Davao City - Tau Chapter
 Notre Dame of Marbel University - Upsilon Chapter
 University of Southern Mindanao (USM), Kabacan - Phi chapter
 Bohol Island State University/Bohol Institute of Technology - Chi Chapter
 Marbel School of Science and Technology - Psi Chapter
 Holy Cross of Davao College - Omega Chapter
 University of Immaculate Conception, Davao City - Alpha Alpha Chapter
 Bukidnon State University/San Isidro College, Malaybalay City - Alpha Beta Chapter
 Southern Mindanao Institute of Technology (SMIT), Isulan - Alpha Gamma Chapter
 Philippine College Foundation, Valencia City, Bukidnon - Alpha Delta Chapter
 STI College Koronadal - Alpha Epsilon chapter
 Regency Polytechnic College, Koronadal City - Alpha Zeta Chapter
 AMA Computer College of Marbel - Alpha Eta Chapter
 University of Mindanao Tagum College - Alpha Theta Chapter
 Samal Institute, Island Garden City of Samal - Alpha Iota Chapter
 Bukidnon State University (Monkayo, COMVAL Campus) - Alpha Kappa Chapter
 Saint Peter's College of Balingasag - Alpha Lambda Chapter
 Holy Cross of Babak College, Island Garden City of Samal - Alpha Mu Chapter
 University of Southeastern Philippines (Tagum Campus) - Alpha Nu chapter
 Hi-Tech Institute of Technology, Gen San., Alpha Xi Chapter
 General Santos Foundation College Institute (GFI) - Alpha Omicron chapter
 Davao Oriental State College of Science and Technology (DOSCST) - Alpha Pi Chapter
 Mati Polytechnic College - Alpha Rho
 Golden State College, Gen San. City - Alpha Sigma Chapter
 Sacred Heart College, Calamba Misamis Occidental - Alpha Tau Chapter
 Notre Dame College of Midsayap - Alpha Upsilon Chapter
 Southern Baptist College, M'lang, North Cotabato - Alpha Phi chapter
 St. Ritas College of Balingasag, (Misamis Oriental) - Alpha Chi chapter
 John Paul College of Davao - Alpha Psi Chapter
 Matalam Polytechnic College - Alpha Omega Chapter
 Philippine College of Technology (PCT), Davao City - Beta Alpha Chapter
 Polytechnic College of Digos - Beta Beta Chapter
 Misamis Oriental Institute of Science and Technology (MOIST), Balingasag - Beta Gamma Chapter
 University of Mindanao Digos College - Beta Delta Chapter
 Legacy College of Compostela - Beta Epsilon Chapter
 Cor Jesu College, Digos City DVO del Sur - Beta Zeta Chapter
 University of Southeastern Philippines (Bislig Campus) - Beta Eta Chapter
 SPAMAST, Digos City - Beta Theta Chapter
 Green Valley College Foundation, Koronadal City - Beta Iota Chapter
 University of Southern Mindanao (Kidapawan City Campus) - Beta Kappa Chapter
 De La Salle John Bosco College, Bislig City - Beta Lambda Chapter
 Notra Dame of Cotabato, Cotabato City - Beta Mu Chapter
 Saint Vincent de Paul College, Bislig City - Beta Nu Chapter
 Cotabato City State Polytechnic College - Beta Xi Chapter
 Northlink Technological College, Panabo City - Beta Omicron Chapter
 St. Mary's of Bansalan College - Beta Pi Chapter
 University of Mindanao Bansalan College - Beta Rho Chapter
 Southern Technological Institute of the Philippines, Bislig City - Beta Sigma Chapter
 Kapalong College of Agriculture and Science and Technology, Kapalong DVO del Norte - Beta Tau Chapter
 AGRO-Industrial Foundation College of the Philippines, Davao City - Beta Upsilon Chapter
 Global System Institute of Technology, Bansalan Davao del Sur - Beta Phi Chapter
 Beta Chi
 Beta Psi
 Mindanao University of Science and Technology formerly known as Don Mariano (Jasaan Campus, Misamis Oriental) - Beta Omega Chapter

Fraternities and sororities in the Philippines
Student organizations established in 1968
1968 establishments in the Philippines